The Hate U Give is a 2018 American drama film co-produced and directed by George Tillman Jr. from a screenplay by Audrey Wells (who died the day before the film's release), based on the 2017 young adult novel of the same name by Angie Thomas. The film was produced by Marty Bowen, Wyck Godfrey, Robert Teitel and Tillman Jr., and stars Amandla Stenberg, Regina Hall, Russell Hornsby, KJ Apa, Sabrina Carpenter, Common, and Anthony Mackie, and follows the fallout after a high school student witnesses a police shooting.

The project was announced on March 23, 2016, and casting took place during August and September 2017. Principal photography began on September 12, 2017, in Atlanta, Georgia. On February 5, 2018, it was announced that Kian Lawley's role was recast after a video of his use of racially offensive slurs resurfaced. A month later, it was announced that Lawley had been replaced by Apa.

The Hate U Give premiered at the 2018 Toronto International Film Festival on September 7, 2018, and was released in the United States on October 5, 2018, by 20th Century Fox. Although the film was a modest box office success, grossing only $34 million worldwide against its $23 million budget, it received critical acclaim, with many praising the performances (particularly those of Stenberg and Hornsby), Wells' screenplay and Tillman Jr.'s direction. The film was nominated for and won numerous accolades, including Stenberg's winning of the NAACP Image Award for Outstanding Actress in a Motion Picture and being nominated for a Critics' Choice Award.

Plot
Starr Carter is a 16-year-old African-American girl who lives in the predominantly black neighborhood of Garden Heights, but attends a predominantly white private school Williamson Prep.

After a gun goes off at a party Starr is attending, Starr is driven home by her childhood best friend, Khalil. While driving home, they are stopped by a police officer for failing to signal at a lane change. The officer barks orders at Khalil, such as to roll down the window and turn off the music. Khalil disagrees with the officer, who instructs him to exit the car.

While outside the car, the officer retrieves Khalil's drivers license and instructs him to keep his hands on the roof while the officer checks his ID. Khalil leans down into the car window to check on Starr, before reaching through the driver-side to pick up a hairbrush. The officer, thinking that Khalil is reaching for a gun, shoots and kills Khalil. As Starr mourns over Khalil, the officer realizes that Khalil was not armed.

Khalil's killing becomes a national news story and causes a town wide protest against racial injustice. Starr's identity as the witness is initially kept secret from everyone outside Starr's familyleaving Starr's two best friends, Hailey Grant and Maya Yang, and Starr's boyfriend, Chris, who all attend Williamson Prep together, unaware of Starr's connection to the killing. Having to keep this secret weighs on Starr, as does her need to keep her Williamson and Garden Heights personas separate.

Starr agrees to be interviewed on television and to testify in front of a grand jury after being encouraged by a civil rights lawyer, April Ofrah. While defending Khalil's character during her interview, in which her identity is hidden, she names the King Lords, the gang that controls her neighborhood. The gang retaliates by threatening Starr and her family, forcing them to move in with her Uncle Carlos, her mom's brother, who is a police detective.

Carlos was a father figure to Starr when her father, Maverick, spent three years in prison for a crime he did not commit. Following his release, Maverick left the gang and became the owner of the Garden Heights grocery store where Starr and her half-brother Seven work. Maverick was only allowed to leave the King Lords because his false confession to a crime kept gang leader King from being locked up. King, who is widely feared in the neighborhood, now lives with Seven's mother Iesha, as well as Seven's half-sister Kenya, who is friends with Starr, and Kenya's younger sister Lyric.

After a grand jury does not indict the officer, Garden Heights erupts into both peaceful protests and warlike riots. In reaction to the decision, Starr takes an increasingly public role, including speaking out during the protests, which are met by police in riot gear. Her increasing identification with the people of Garden Heights causes tension with Starr's school friends, and especially between her and Chris. Starr and Maya eventually start standing up to Hailey's racist comments, breaking up their friendship, and Chris remains supportive of Starr.

Starr and Seven get trapped in Maverick's grocery store, which is fire-bombed by King and his gang. The two escape with the help of Maverick and some other Garden Heights business owners. When the police arrive, Starr's younger brother Sekani points a gun at King. Starr defuses the situation. The community stands up against King, who goes to jail. Starr eventually promises to keep Khalil's memory alive, and to continue her advocacy against police violence by "any means necessary."

Cast 

 Amandla Stenberg as Starr Carter
 Regina Hall as Lisa Carter, Starr & Sekani's mother and Maverick's wife
 Russell Hornsby as Maverick Carter, Starr, Sekani & Seven's father
 Algee Smith as Khalil Harris, Starr's childhood best friend
 Lamar Johnson as Seven Carter, Starr, Sekani, Kenya and Lyric’s older half-brother
 Issa Rae as April Ofrah
 K. J. Apa as Chris Bryant, Starr's boyfriend
 Common as Carlos, Lisa's brother and uncle to Starr & Sekani
 Anthony Mackie as King, Iesha's husband, father to Kenya and Lyric, stepfather to Seven
 Dominique Fishback as Kenya, Starr's best friend and one of three half-sisters to Seven
 Sabrina Carpenter as Hailey Grant, one of Starr's school friends
 Megan Lawless as Maya Yang, one of Starr's school friends
 TJ Wright as Sekani Carter, Starr's younger brother and Seven's half-brother

Production 
On March 23, 2016, it was announced that Amandla Stenberg would star as Starr Carter in the film, based on the novel The Hate U Give by Angie Thomas. George Tillman Jr. would direct, from a screenplay by Audrey Wells, while producers would be Marty Bowen and Wyck Godfrey through State Street Pictures and Temple Hill Entertainment. On August 1, 2017, Russell Hornsby and Lamar Johnson were cast in the film to play Maverick Carter, Starr's father, and Seven Carter, Starr's brother, respectively. On August 3, Regina Hall was added as Lisa Carter, Starr's mother, and on August 15, Algee Smith also joined, to play Khalil, Starr's childhood best friend. On August 22, it was reported that Common had been cast as Starr's uncle, a police officer.

On August 23, 2017, Issa Rae was cast in the film to play April, the social activist who encourages Starr to speak out publicly. On August 24, Sabrina Carpenter was added as well, playing Hailey, one of Starr's high school friends. On September 12, Anthony Mackie and Kian Lawley joined the film to play the local drug dealer King, and Starr's boyfriend, Chris, respectively until on February 5, 2018, it was announced that Lawley had been fired from the film due to a resurfaced video showing Lawley using racially offensive slurs, resulting in his role being recast and his scenes reshot. On April 3, 2018, it was announced that KJ Apa would replace Lawley.

Principal photography on the film began on September 12, 2017, in Atlanta, Georgia. and wrapped on November 4, 2017.  Reshoots were shot along with the KJ Apa's scenes in April 2018.

Music

Release
The Hate U Give began a limited release in the United States on October 5, 2018, before a scheduled expansion the following week, and then a wide release on October 19, the day it opened worldwide. It was previously scheduled to go directly into wide release on the 19th.

The day prior to the film's release, screenwriter Audrey Wells died from cancer at the age of 58. 20th Century Fox released a statement saying, "We are simply heartbroken. Audrey's was a voice of empowerment and courage, and her words will live on through the strong, determined female characters she brought to life. Our thoughts are with Brian, Tatiana, and all of Audrey's family and friends at this difficult time."

The Hate U Give was released on digital download on January 8, 2019, and on DVD/Blu-Ray on January 22, 2019.

Reception

Box office
The Hate U Give grossed $29.7 million in the United States and Canada, and $5.2 million in other territories, for a total worldwide gross of $34.9 million, against a production budget of $23 million. Although when Disney acquired Fox, The Hollywood Reporter stated that the film has lost Fox a total of $30–$40 million dollars. In its limited opening weekend, The Hate U Give made $512,035 from 36 theaters, for an average of $14,233 per venue, finishing 13th. Playing in a total of 248 theaters the following weekend, the film made $1.8 million, finishing ninth. The film was projected to gross $7–9 million when it expanded to 2,303 theaters on October 19. It made $2.5 million on its first day of wide release, including $300,000 from Thursday night previews. It went on to gross $7.5 million over the weekend, finishing sixth at the box office. It fell 33% to $5.1 million the following weekend, remaining in sixth.

Critical response

The website's critical consensus reads, "Led by a breakout turn from Amandla Stenberg, the hard-hitting The Hate U Give emphatically proves the YA genre has room for much more than magic and romance." On Metacritic, the film has a weighted average score of 81 out of 100, based on 44 critics, indicating "universal acclaim." Audiences polled by CinemaScore gave the film a rare average grade of "A+" on an A+ to F scale, while PostTrak reported filmgoers gave it an 88% positive score and a 74% "definite recommend."

Writing for Rolling Stone, Peter Travers gave the film four out of five stars, calling it an "exceptional adaptation," and writing, "It is impossible to over-praise Stenberg's incandescent performance, a gathering storm that grows in ferocity and feeling with each scene. Stenberg nails every nuance of a role that keeps throwing challenges at her, none more devastating than when it becomes impossible for Starr to remain stuck in neutral." Scott Mendelson, writing for Forbes, stated that the film deserved to be an Academy Awards frontrunner for its screenplay, Stenberg and Russell Hornsby's performances, and the picture itself, saying it "belongs among the final list of would-be Best Picture nominees."

Keith Watson of Slant Magazine, however, gave the film two out of four stars, writing, "Given its intensely relevant subject matter, the film can't help but churn up a lot of raw emotions—and the allusions to Michael Brown, Sandra Bland, and Emmett Till are reminders of the real-life sorrow that birthed this film—but Tillman's anonymous direction is content merely to illustrate the screenplay without ever bringing it to life. Even scenes that are meant to be tinged with menace and danger—run-ins with a local gang, a shooting at a party—feel about as raw as an episode of Degrassi." The film was also criticized by some female African-American critics as well, including Soraya Nadia McDonald of Andscape, who said that "In dealing with all of it, the book character finds her confidence and her voice. But the movie version of The Hate U Give leaves me unsure that its makers ever found theirs."

Accolades

See also
 List of black films of the 2010s
 List of hood films
 Police brutality in the United States

References

External links 
 
 

2018 films
2010s teen drama films
20th Century Fox films
American teen drama films
Films about activists
Films about racism in the United States
Films based on American novels
Films based on young adult literature
Films directed by George Tillman Jr.
Films set in Mississippi
Films shot in Atlanta
Hood films
Films with screenplays by Audrey Wells
Temple Hill Entertainment films
2018 drama films
Films scored by Dustin O'Halloran
Films produced by Wyck Godfrey
2010s English-language films
2010s American films
African-American films